Heðin Mortensen (born April 7, 1946) is a Faroese politician member of the Social Democratic Party. He is the current mayor of the Municipality of Tórshavn since 1 January 2021. He was also mayor from 1 January 2005 to 31 December 2016.

Mortensen was born in Trongisvágur. He worked as a mechanic from 1961 to 1978, when he became an insurance agent for The Faroe Insurance Company. He headed the Tórshavn Rowing Club from 1973 to 1979, the Tórshavn Athletics Association from 1975 to 1978, and the Faroese Athletics Association from 1980 to 2000. He was also the chair of the Tórshavn Theater Society from 1996 to 2003. He has been a supervisory board member of the power company SEV since 1973 and was its director from 1993 to 1997.

In politics, Mortensen became a member of the Tórshavn municipal council in 1973. He served as deputy mayor from 2001 to 2005 before becoming mayor. He was a member of the Union Party from 1988 to 2004. As a member of the Union Party, Mortensen was also active in politics at the national level. He intermittently participated in the Faroese Parliament as a deputy representative from 1989 to 1991 and in 1993. He later served in the Faroese Parliament as a representative from the South Streymoy district from 1998 to 2004. He became a deputy representative again in 2008, but this time for the Social Democratic Party. In 2015 he was elected to the Faroese Parliament as a member of the Social Democratic Party.

Mortensen has received numerous Nordic honors for his involvement in sports. He was named a knight of the Order of the Dannebrog in 1991, and a knight 1st class of the same order in 2003.

Mortensen is a supporter of whaling in the Faroe Islands.

References

Living people
1946 births
Mayors of Tórshavn
Members of the Løgting
People from Trongisvágur